The Nilgiri clouded yellow, Colias nilagiriensis, sometimes considered a subspecies of Colias erate, is a small butterfly native to Shola forests of the Western Ghats. It belongs to the family Pieridae.

Some authors treat this as a subspecies of the eastern pale clouded yellow (C. erate) while others consider it on the basis of its geographic isolatation as a phylogenetically distinct species Colias nilagiriensis.

Description

Charles Thomas Bingham (1907) gives a detailed description:

 
It is found in Shola forests, which are subtropical rainforests in the valleys of tall meadows in the Western Ghats. Therefore, it has a range from Kudremukha in central Karnataka, to Coorg, Wayanad, Nilgiris, and down to Silent Valley National Park, to the Anamalais. It is also found in the Periyar National Park, where it is found in the Sholas around Kakki Reservoir, and down to the Pothigai and Ponmudi.

Life history
The larvae feed on Parochetus communis and Trifolium.

See also
List of butterflies of India (Pieridae)

Cited references

Other References
 
 
 
 
 

Colias
Butterflies of Asia
Butterflies described in 1859